The field hockey tournament at the 1960 Summer Olympics in Rome, Italy was contested from August 26 to September 9, with sixteen participating teams. Only men competed in field hockey at these Games. Pakistan won the gold medal, defeating India in the final and ending India's run of six successive gold medals. Spain won the bronze medal.

Participating nations
Sixteen teams were placed into four preliminary groups of four teams each. After a preliminary round-robin set of matches, the top two teams in each group advanced to the quarter-finals.

Group A
 
 
 
 

Group B
 
 
 
 

Group C
 
 
 
 

Group D

Squads

Preliminary round

Group A

Second place play-off

New Zealand advanced to the quarter-finals.  The Netherlands continued to the classification matches for 9th–12th place.

Group B

Second place play-off

Australia advanced to the quarter-finals. Poland continued to the classification matches for 9th–12th place.

Group C

Group D

Knockout stage

Bracket

Quarter-final losers continued to play classification matches to determine 5th–8th place. The Great Britain versus Kenya match lasted 127 minutes and needed six overtime periods to determine the winner.

Quarter-finals

Semi-finals

Bronze medal match

Gold medal match

Classification round

Fifth to eighth place classification

5–8th place semi-finals

The match was abandoned due to darkness with the score tied at 1-1 after 40 minutes of extra time. Australia was initially awarded the match after a coin toss, but after an appeal by Kenya, the match was declared drawn and a replay was ordered.

Replay

Fifth place game

After the Australia-Kenya match was declared a draw and a replay ordered on appeal, this match was declared null and void, and a replay was ordered between New Zealand and the winner of the Australia-Kenya replay.

Replay

Seventh place game
The seventh-place game between Germany and Kenya was scratched as the German team had flown home after the Closing Ceremony. Both teams were awarded joint seventh place.

Ninth to twelfth place classification
As Poland declined to participate in the classification matches, they were awarded twelfth place: the other three teams played a round-robin set of matches.

An Italian traffic policeman on duty just outside the field blew his whistle. The Belgians thought it was the umpire's whistle and stopped playing, whereupon the French scored the only goal of the game.

Thirteenth to sixteenth place classification
As Denmark declined to participate in the classification matches, they were awarded sixteenth place.  The other three teams played a round-robin set of matches.

Final standings

Medalists

References

External links
 
 

 
Field hockey at the Summer Olympics
1960 Summer Olympics events
Summer Olympics
1960 Summer Olympics